Joseph Kirby Smith (11 June 1908 – 1993) was an English footballer who played as a left-back in the Football League for Watford.

Smith played reserve football for Leicester City and later played for Watford, making his only Third Division South appearance in the final game of the 1930–31 season.

He later played football and cricket for Bentley Engineering, captaining both teams, and played amateur football in Leicester.

Four of his six brothers were also footballers. Billy and Jack both played for South Shields and played in 1934 FA Cup Final together for Portsmouth. Sep also played for Leicester City, and Tom played for South Shields and later played for Manchester United and Northampton Town.

References

1908 births
1993 deaths
People from Whitburn, Tyne and Wear
Footballers from Tyne and Wear
Footballers from County Durham
English footballers
Association football fullbacks
Whitburn F.C. players
Leicester City F.C. players
Watford F.C. players
Joe